Fähnrichschüler (abbreviated FRS) were German Democratic Republic soldiers who were in training for a career as Fähnrich in the . The two-year training was offered in the National People's Army, the Border Troops and in parts of the Ministry for State Security.

Training
The Fähnrich corps was supposed to provide highly specialized "long service members" below the officer level and close a skills gap in the technical careers. For Fähnrichs of the NVA a specialized technical education was aimed for.

First advanced senior NCOs, usually in the rank of Stabsfeldwebel, were promoted to the rank of Fähnrich, even without them having a specialist technical college qualification. This allowed them to retain specialists who would otherwise have retired after their ten years of service.

Later, only Fähnrichschüler could be appointed Fähnrich if they had successfully completed a two-year training course at a military technical school or an officers' colleges. During this training, the soldiers wore Fähnrichschüler ranks that corresponded to their service branch.

Development after 1989/90
After German reunification in October 1990, the remaining Fähnrichschüler and Offiziersschüler students, were taken into the Bundeswehr and kept until they could complete their diplomas. The ranks were removed in 1992 and 1993 respectively.

Rank insignia

See also 
 Ranks of the National People's Army
 Glossary of German military terms

References

Military of East Germany
Military ranks of Germany